Western Fijian, also known as Wayan is an Oceanic language spoken in Fiji by about 57,000 people.

It is distinct from Eastern Fijian (also known as Bauan or Standard Fijian).

Phonology

 is heard in the Wayan dialect.

Western Fijian in particular, is unique among Fijian languages for having labialized velar consonants. All vowels come in long and short forms, and so does the bilabial nasal (/m/).

References

West Fijian languages
Languages of Fiji